The Liyang–Ningde Expressway, commonly referred to as the Lining Expressway is an expressway that connects Fu'an, Ningde and Liyang, Changzhou in China. It is a spur of G40 Shanghai–Xi'an Expressway and it travels through the provinces of Jiangsu, Zhejiang and Fujian. It is split into many discontiguous sections.

Connections
 Ningbo–Dongguan Expressway: Banzhong Hub
 Changchun–Shenzhen Expressway: Xinchang Hub, Beibu Hub, Yunjing Hub
 Yangzhou–Liyang Expressway: Xinchang Hub
 Shanghai-Chongqing Expressway: Oath Festival Hub
 Hangzhou–Ruili Expressway: Chengcun-jiang Junction
 Shanghai-Kunming Expressway: Lutangjiao Hub
 Hangzhou–Changsha Expressway: Shouchang Hub

References

Chinese national-level expressways
Expressways in Fujian
Expressways in Jiangsu
Expressways in Zhejiang